The 2013–14 Midland Football Combination season was the 77th and final in the history of Midland Football Combination, a football competition in England.

At the end of the season, the Midland Alliance and the Midland Combination merged to form the Midland Football League. The Midland Alliance clubs formed the Premier Division, while the Midland Combination clubs formed Division One.

Premier Division

The Premier Division featured 17 clubs which competed in the division last season, along with two new clubs:
Alvis Sporting Club, promoted from Division One
Studley, relegated from the Midland Football Alliance

League table

Results

Division One

The Division One featured 13 clubs which competed in the division last season, along with two new clubs, promoted from Division Two:
Barnt Green Spartak
Sutton United

League table

Division Two

The Division Two featured 11 clubs which competed in the division last season, along with six new clubs:
Northfield Town, relegated from Division One
Austrey Rangers
Badsey Rangers
Coventry United
Paget Rangers
Rostance Edwards

League table

References

External links
 Midland Football Combination

2013-14
10